Menegazzia corrugata is a species of foliose lichen from Australia. It was described as new to science in 1992.

See also
List of Menegazzia species

References

Lichens described in 1992
Lichen species
Lichens of Australia
corrugata
Taxa named by Peter Wilfred James